The Beggar Child is a 1914 American silent short film directed by William Desmond Taylor, starring Ed Coxen, John Steppling, and Winifred Greenwood.

Cast
Ed Coxen as Hugo, an artist
Winifred Greenwood as Lycia, a child model
John Steppling as Marco, a peasant
 George Field as Count Roberto
 Charlotte Burton as Rosa, his servant
King Clark as Dan Street, an art student

References

External links

1914 films
1914 drama films
Silent American drama films
American silent short films
American black-and-white films
1914 short films
American Film Company films
Films directed by Henry Otto
Films directed by William Desmond Taylor
1910s American films
1910s English-language films
American drama short films